Ezequiel Guillermo Jesús Amaya (born February 20, 1978) is an Argentine footballer, who is currently off contract, after playing for Club Almagro in  Primera B Nacional Argentina.

Biography
He has had a career playing all over South America, and even had a short half year stint in the Middle East with Qatar club Al-Sadd.

He was rumoured to be heading to Australia to play for North Queensland Fury in the A-League, but apparently no showed.

References

1978 births
Living people
Footballers from Buenos Aires
Argentine footballers
Argentine expatriate footballers
Deportivo Italia players
Universidad de Chile footballers
Expatriate footballers in Brazil
Expatriate footballers in Chile
Expatriate footballers in Ecuador
Expatriate footballers in Venezuela
Argentine expatriate sportspeople in Brazil
Argentine expatriate sportspeople in Chile
Argentine expatriate sportspeople in Ecuador
Argentine expatriate sportspeople in Venezuela
Al Sadd SC players
Qatar Stars League players
Association football midfielders